Physics Reports is a peer-reviewed scientific journal, a review section of Physics Letters that has been published by Elsevier since 1971. The journal publishes long and deep reviews on all aspects of physics. In average, the length of these reports is the same of a short book. These reports aim to make their main points intelligible to non-specialists. According to the Journal Citation Reports, the journal has a 2020 impact factor of 25.6, as reported in the official website of the Journal.

References

External links 
 

Physics review journals
Elsevier academic journals
English-language journals
Publications established in 1971
Weekly journals